Genevieve "Chloe" Mann (born November 12, 1990) is an American indoor volleyball middle blocker. She played college volleyball at University of Florida.

Awards

Individual
 2016 VTV Cup Championship "Best Middle Blocker"
 2017 Thai-Denmark Super League "Best Scorer"

Club 
 2016–17 Thailand League -  Champion, with Supreme Chonburi
 2017 Thai-Denmark Super League -  Champion, with Supreme Chonburi
 2017 Asian Club Championship -  Champion, with Supreme Chonburi

References

External links
French League Profile

1990 births
Living people
American women's volleyball players
Florida Gators women's volleyball players
Sportspeople from Florida
Middle blockers
Expatriate volleyball players in France
Expatriate volleyball players in Thailand
African-American volleyball players
American expatriate sportspeople in France
American expatriate sportspeople in Thailand
21st-century African-American sportspeople
21st-century African-American women